Khaplu and (Balti: ཁཔ་ལུ།), also spelt Khapalu, is a city that serves as the administrative capital of the Ghanche District of Gilgit-Baltistan in northern Pakistan. It guarded the trade route to Ladakh along the Shyok River east of its confluence with the Indus.

Khaplu is a base for trekking into the Hushe valley, which leads to the high peaks of Masherbrum, K6, K7, and Chogolisa. Khaplu has a 700-year-old mosque, Chaqchan, founded by Ameer Kabeer Syed Ali Hamadani (RA). Other tourist sites include Ehlie broq, Hanjor, ThoqsiKhar, Kaldaq, and the Shyok River.

History
According to tradition, Syed Ali Hamdani arrived in Khaplu in the late 14th century and converted locals to Islam. To this day, mosques and khanqahs attributed to him still exist in the region.

The first mention of the former small kingdom called Khápula is in Mirza Haidar's work Tarikh-i-Rashidi,  which lists the Khaplu district of Balti(stan). Khaplu was also very well known in the 17th and 18th centuries due to its close political and family ties with the royal family of the neighbouring country of Ladakh.

The first European to visit Khaplu was probably Captain Claude Martin Wade, who mentioned "Chílú" in 1835 in an essay in the  Journal of the Asiatic Society of Bengal. Subsequently, William Moorcroft and George Trebeck wrote in their 1841 book: "Kafalun is a province west of Nobra, on the left bank of the Shayuk." Godfrey Vigne was in the area in 1835-1838, relying in particular on the local mountain fortress, commented that he was still in an intact condition 

Alexander Cunningham, who did not visit Baltistan, published a brief geographical description of Khaplu and a genealogy of its rulers in 1854. Thomas Thomson travelled there in November 1847 and briefly described a place of remarkable beauty.  Jane Duncan reached Khaplu in 1904 and stayed there for three weeks. De Filippi, who reached Khaplu in 1913, characterized the site as follows: "It is, perhaps, the loveliest oasis in all the region." Further information on Khaplu was included in a travel report by Arthur Neve.

Geography 

In contrast to Skardu and Shigar, the territory of Khaplu was not focused on a single large river valley, but was instead spread over the three valleys of Shayok, namely on the territory of the present town of Khaplu, the valley of Thalle River, and the Hushe/Saltoro Valley. The area around the mouth of the river in the Thalle Shayok formed the western border of the kingdom. 

Today Ganache district, whose administrative centre is located in Khaplu, covers Balghar and Daghoni in addition to the mouth of the Indus in Shayok. It includes the former Kingdom of Kiris as a military bulwark against incursions of the Skardu and Shigar. In Haldi, in eastern Hushe/Saltoro Tal, was another fortress.

Tourism 
Raja Palace is a beautiful building and the last and best Tibetan-style palace in Pakistan. Khaplu Khanqah is attributed to Mir Mukhtar Akhyar and was built in 1712 AD/1124 AH.

Khaplu is the gateway to Masherbrum Peak, K-7, K-6, Chogolisa for mountaineers and Gondogoro la, Gondogoro Peak, Saraksa Glacier, Gondogoro Glacier, Masherbrum Glacier, Aling Glacier, Machlu Broq, Thaely La, Daholi lake, Kharfaq Lake, Ghangche Lake and Bara Lake for trekkers. There is rafting on the Shyok River and rock climbing places like Biamari Thoqsikhar and DowoKraming (hot spring).

Architecture 

The most important religious monuments in Khaplu are the great Khanqa prayer hall and the Chaqchan Mosque. The former was built in 1712 by Sayyed Mohammad, a saint of the Islamic Nūrbkahshīya sect, whose Astana grave monument is in the immediate vicinity. The Astana grave monument has been restored by the Aga Khan Trust for Culture Pakistan and thereby saved from total disintegration.

Transport 
Khaplu is only approachable by road. The normal road into Khaplu is a link road from the Skardu Valley. Four or five other roads link to Kashmir, Ladakh and Yarqand.

An all-weather road once linked Khaplu to Drass, a city in Ladakh. Since the joining of Gilgit Baltistan with Pakistan, the road has been closed. However, today there are a few helipads (helicopter landing pads).

References

Bibliography
Shridhar Kaul: Ladakh through the Ages, towards a New Identity. Indus Publishing 1992,  (resricted online copy (Google Books))
Sarina Singh, Lindsay Brown, Paul Clammer, Rodney Cocks, John Mock, Kimberley O'Neil: Pakistan & the Karakoram Highway. Lonely Planet 2008, p. 292-293 (resricted online copy (Google Books))

See also
Khaplu Palace

External links

Khaplu in the Tibet-Encyclopaedia  - contains a variety of photos of Khaplu as well
Fort Khaplu auf archnet.org
View of the village at panoramio.com
Photos from Khaplu by Atif Khan Youguvi
Tarikh-i-Rashidi on Wikisource

Populated places in Ghanche District
Baltistan